Elizabeth of Rhuddlan (7 August 1282 – 5 May 1316) was the eighth and youngest daughter of King Edward I of England and Queen Eleanor of Castile. Of all of her siblings, she was closest to her younger brother King Edward II, as they were only two years apart in age.

First marriage
In April 1285 there were negotiations with Floris V for Elizabeth's betrothal to his son John I, Count of Holland. The offer was accepted and John was sent to England to be educated. On 8 January 1297 Elizabeth was married to John at Ipswich. In attendance at the marriage were Elizabeth's sister Margaret, her father, Edward I of England, her brother Edward, and Humphrey de Bohun. After the wedding Elizabeth was expected to go to Holland with her husband, but did not wish to go, leaving her husband to go alone. It is recorded that while in Ipswich the King, in some outburst, threw his daughter's coronet into the fire. A great ruby and a great  emerald, stones supplied by Adam the Goldsmith, were lost as a result.

After some time travelling England, it was decided Elizabeth should follow her husband. Her father accompanied her, travelling through the Southern Netherlands between Antwerp, Mechelen, Leuven and Brussels, before ending up in Ghent. There they remained for a few months, spending Christmas with her two sisters Eleanor and Margaret. On 10 November 1299, John died of dysentery, though there were rumours of his murder. No children had been born from the marriage.

Second marriage
On her return trip to England, Elizabeth went through Brabant to see her sister Margaret. When she arrived in England, she met her stepmother Margaret, whom Edward had married while Elizabeth was in Holland. On 14 November 1302 Elizabeth was married to Humphrey de Bohun, 4th Earl of Hereford, 3rd of Essex, also Constable of England, at Westminster Abbey.

In August 1304, she was pregnant and travelled from Linlithgow Palace in Scotland to Knaresborough Castle. She gave birth to her second son, Humphrey de Bohun, in September, assisted by a holy relic of the girdle of the Virgin, brought especially from Westminster Abbey. Humphrey died about six weeks later and was buried at Westminster Abbey with his sister Margaret.

Issue
The children of Elizabeth and Humphrey de Bohun, 4th Earl of Hereford were:
 Margaret de Bohun (born 1302 – died 7 Feb. 1304).
 Humphrey de Bohun (born c. Oct. 1303 – died c. Oct. 1304).
 Lady Eleanor de Bohun (17 October 1304 – 1363)
 John de Bohun, 5th Earl of Hereford (23 November 1306 – 20 January 1336)
 Humphrey de Bohun, 6th Earl of Hereford (6 December c. 1309 – 1361)
 Margaret de Bohun, 2nd Countess of Devon (3 April 1311 – 1391)
 William de Bohun, 1st Earl of Northampton (1312–1360). 
 Edward de Bohun (1312–1334), twin of William
 Agnes, Married Robert de Ferrers, 2nd Baron Ferrers of Chartley, son of John de Ferrers, 1st Baron Ferrers of Chartley
 Eneas de Bohun, (1314 – after 1322); he is mentioned in his father's will
 Isabel de Bohun (born and died 5 May 1316)

Later life

During Christmas 1315, Elizabeth, who was pregnant with her eleventh child, was visited by her sister-in-law, Queen Isabella of France. On 5 May 1316 she went into labour, giving birth to her daughter Isabella. Both Elizabeth and her daughter Isabella died shortly after the birth.

Elizabeth was interred at Waltham Abbey, Essex, together with her infant daughter & other members of the de Bohun family.

Ancestry

References

Sources
Cutter, William Richard. Genealogical and Personal Memoirs Vol. I, Lewis Historical Publishing Co., New York, 1910. (p. 1399) googlebooks Accessed  28 April 2008
Everett Green, Mary Anne. Lives of the Princesses of England Vol. III London 1857 pages 56-
Verity, Brad. "The Children of Elizabeth, Countess of Hereford, Daughter of Edward I of England," Foundations, Volume 6, June 2014, pages 3–10.
 pages 83–85
 Lines 6-29, 6-30, 7-29, 7-30, 15-29, 15-30, 97-31, 97-32.

External links

1282 births
1316 deaths
13th-century English nobility
14th-century English nobility
14th-century Welsh nobility
13th-century English women
14th-century English women
14th-century Welsh women
Hereford
English princesses
House of Plantagenet
Countesses of Holland
Deaths in childbirth
Bohun family
Daughters of kings
Children of Edward I of England